The Royal Portbury Dock is part of the Port of Bristol, in England.  It is situated near the village of Portbury on the southern side of the mouth of the Avon, where the river joins the Severn estuary — the Avonmouth Docks are on the opposite side of the Avon, within Avonmouth.  The deepwater dock was constructed between 1972 and 1977, and is now a major port for the import of motor vehicles into the UK. The M5 motorway runs nearby, and the huge car storage compounds around the dock are visible from the Avonmouth Bridge. A waste industrial area west of the port is being developed as the Portbury Ashlands Nature Reserve.

The Royal Portbury Dock has the largest entrance lock into any UK port, accommodating vessels up to  beam,  length and  draft.

Operator
The dock is now operated by The Bristol Port Company, which also operates Avonmouth Docks, and has done since 1991 when it purchased a 150-year lease from Bristol City Council.  Between 2000 and 2002 the Portishead Railway was repaired and extended to the dock at a cost of £21 million.

Trades

Motor vehicles are both loaded and discharged, and stored on paved quay areas and storage compounds. In 2004, over 650,000 vehicles were handled. During 1996, the motor vehicle trade was awarded the International Quality Standard ISO 9002. Royal Portbury Dock can accommodate up to six RoRo vessels simultaneously.

Aviation fuel tankers up to 120,000 dwt can discharge at the Bristol Aviation Fuel Terminal which opened in 2003, and feeds directly into the UK's pipeline and storage network.

Coal and other bulk cargoes can be discharged with two continuous ship unloaders and two gantry grab cranes, allowing for 5,000 tonne per hour throughput.

Since 2013 the wings for the Airbus A400M Atlas have left Portbury on 3 specialised ferries including the Ville De Bordeaux, after travelling from the factory at Filton. They go via St Nazaire to Seville. This is part of the Itinéraire à Grand Gabarit transportation system.

Containers and Forest Products are also handled at the dock.

Technical

The port experiences the second largest tidal range in the world. The Portbury Dock, like Avonmouth Dock across the river, is impounded and the water level within each dock is maintained by lock gates and impounding pumps. The pumps maintain a minimum water level in the dock when water is lost to the sea through ships entering/exiting the dock.

See also
Port of Bristol

References

External links

The Bristol Port Company website
UK Government DfT Casestudy
Portishead and Bristol Lifeboat
Port of Bristol Authority archive collection

History of Bristol
Transport in Bristol
Ports and harbours of Somerset
Ports and harbours of the Bristol Channel
Port of Bristol